Napco Security Technologies, Inc. was set up in 1969 and now is based in Amityville, New York. The company focuses on security products, such as electronic locking devices, alarm systems, and building access control systems. The company was formerly known as Napco Security Systems, Inc.

Products 
The company's building access control systems include different kinds of identification readers, control panels, PC-based computers, and electronically activated door-locking devices; alarm systems include automatic communicators, control panels, digital keypad systems, door security devices. In addition to the major two companies, the company also provides peripheral equipment and Video Surveillance Systems, including video cameras and monitors, recording device and remote communication device.

Brands 

Main products of the company are its security systems, alarm lock, continental access, Marks USA and product lines of the company are Gemini and new F64-Series hardwire/wireless intrusion systems, iSee Video internet video solutions, Trilogy standalone electronic PIN/Prox access locks, and Marks USA's i-Que lock and Hi-Security cylinder lines.

Research and development 
Jan 2014, NAPCO Security Technologies, Inc. introduced the new SaaS-based products iBridge Connected Home solutions, enabling remote management of thermostats, locks, lighting, video cameras, and other appliances via most smartphones.

In August 2013, the company announced the availability of the Continental Access Accelaterm CICP2800 Super-Speed Controller that provided greater speed, functionality and integration for credential performance.

References 

Security companies of the United States
Manufacturing companies based in New York (state)
Manufacturing companies established in 1969
Technology companies established in 1969
Companies listed on the Nasdaq